The  (in Latin) or  (various forms in Greek) were early Slavic tribes that raided, invaded and settled the Balkans in the Early Middle Ages and eventually became the progenitors of modern South Slavs. They were mentioned by early Byzantine chroniclers as barbarians having appeared at the Byzantine borders along with the Antes (East Slavs), another Slavic group. The Sclaveni were differentiated from the Antes and Wends (West Slavs); however, they were described as kin. Eventually, most South Slavic tribes accepted Byzantine or Frankish suzerainty, and came under their cultural influences and Chalcedonian Christianity. The term was widely used as general catch-all term until the emergence of separate tribal names by the 10th century.

Customs

The Sclaveni had similar if not identical customs and culture as the Antes. They were carefully described by chroniclers such as Procopius and Maurice, whose works contribute greatly to our understanding of these two Early Slavic peoples. 

Maurice writes that the Slavs were very hospitable people, tribes that mistreated guests were attacked for their dishonour. Prisoners were not kept forever and after a certain period of time, captives were allowed to be let loose or to join the community. Settlements were built in hard to reach forests, lakes and marshes as they were hard to attack, with exits in many directions for escape. They farmed many crops, especially millet, but also had much livestock of many sorts. Maurice praises their toleration of discomfort when necessary, and the loyalty of married women to their husbands. The Antes and Sclaveni were independent, refusing to be governed or enslaved.  They lived under democracy, with all matters being referred to the people.

The religion of the Sclaveni, like other Slavic tribes and peoples was Slavic paganism. 

The Antes and Sclaveni were skilled warriors, especially in guerrilla warfare, taking advantage of terrain. They preferred to fight in dense woodland instead of pitch battle, although field battles and sieges were also recorded. Their weapons were javelins, spears, bows nocked with poison tipped arrows and sturdy wooden shields, but body armour was rare.

Terminology

The Byzantines broadly grouped the numerous Slav tribes living in proximity with the Eastern Roman Empire into two groups: the Sklavenoi and the Antes. The derived Greek term  was used for Slav tribes in Byzantine Macedonia and the Peloponnese; these Slavic territories were initially outside of Byzantine control. By 800, however, the term also referred specifically to Slavic mobile military colonists who settled as allies within the territories of the Byzantine Empire. Slavic military settlements appeared in the Peloponnese, Asia Minor, and Italy.

Byzantine historiography
Procopius gives the most detail about the Sclaveni and Antes. The Sclaveni are also mentioned by Jordanes ( 551), Pseudo-Caesarius (560), Menander Protector (mid-6th c.), the Strategikon (late 6th c.), etc.

History

6th century

The first Slavic raid south of the Danube was recorded by Procopius, who mentions an attack of the Antes, "who dwell close to the Sclaveni", probably in 518. Scholar Michel Kazanski identified the 6th-century Prague culture and Sukow-Dziedzice group as Sclaveni archaeological cultures, and the Penkovka culture was identified as Antes. In the 530s, Emperor Justinian seems to have used divide and conquer and the Sclaveni and Antes are mentioned as fighting each other.

Sclaveni are first mentioned in the context of the military policy on the Danube frontier of Byzantine Emperor Justinian I (r. 527–565). In 537, 1,600 cavalry, made up of mostly Sclaveni and Antes, were shipped by Justinian to Italy to rescue Belisarius. Sometime between 533–34 and 545 (probably before the 539–40 Hun invasion), there was a conflict between the Antes and Sclaveni in Eastern Europe. Procopius noted that the two "became hostile to one another and engaged in battle" until a Sclavene victory. The conflict was likely aided or initiated by the Byzantines. In the same period, the Antes raided Thrace. The Romans also recruited mounted mercenaries from both tribes against the Ostrogoths. The two tribes were at peace by 545. Notably, one of the captured Antes claimed to be Roman general Chilbudius (who was killed in 534 by barbarians at the Danube). He was sold to the Antes and freed. He revealed his true identity but was pressured and continued to claim that he was Chilbudius. The Antes are last mentioned as anti-Byzantine belligerents in 545, and the Sclaveni continued to raid the Balkans. The Antes became Roman allies by treaty in 545. Between 545 and 549, the Sclaveni raided deep into Roman territory. In 547, 300 Antes fought the Ostrogoths in Lucania. In the summer of 550, the Sclaveni came close to Naissus, and were seen as a great threat, however, their intent on capturing Thessaloniki and the surroundings was thwarted by Germanus. After this, for a year, the Sclaveni spent their time in Dalmatia "as if in their own land". The Sclaveni then raided Illyricum and returned home with booty. In 558 the Avars arrived at the Black Sea steppe, and defeated the Antes between the Dnieper and Dniester. The Avars subsequently allied themselves with the Sclaveni.

Daurentius (fl. 577–579), the first Slavic chieftain recorded by name, was sent an Avar embassy requesting his Slavs to accept Avar suzerainty and pay tribute, because the Avars knew that the Slavs had amassed great wealth after repeatedly plundering the Balkans. Daurentius reportedly retorted that "Others do not conquer our land, we conquer theirs [...] so it shall always be for us", and had the envoys slain. Bayan then campaigned (in 578) against Daurentius' people, with aid from the Byzantines, and set fire to many of their settlements, although this did not stop the Slavic raids deep into the Byzantine Empire.  In 578, a large army of Sclaveni devastated Thrace and other areas. In the 580s, the Antes were bribed to attack Sclaveni settlements.

By the 580s, as the Slav communities on the Danube became larger and more organised, and as the Avars exerted their influence, raids became larger and resulted in permanent settlement.
John of Ephesus noted in 581: "the accursed people of the Slavs set out and plundered all of Greece, the regions surrounding Thessalonica, and Thrace, taking many towns and castles, laying waste, burning, pillaging, and seizing the whole country." However, John exaggerated the intensity of the Slavic incursions since he was influenced by his confinement in Constantinople from 571 up until 579. Moreover, he perceived the Slavs as God's instrument for punishing the persecutors of the Monophysites.
By 586, they managed to raid the western Peloponnese, Attica, Epirus, leaving only the east part of Peloponnese, which was mountainous and inaccessible. In 586 AD, as many as 100,000 Slav warriors raided Thessaloniki. The final attempt to restore the northern border was from 591 to 605, when the end of conflicts with Persia allowed Emperor Maurice to transfer units to the north. However he was deposed after a military revolt in 602, and the Danubian frontier collapsed one and a half decades later (see Maurice's Balkan campaigns).

7th century
In 602, the Avars attacked the Antes; this is the last mention of Antes in historical sources. In 615, during the reign of Heraclius (r. 610–641), the whole Balkans was regarded as Sklavinia – inhabited or controlled by Slavs. Chatzon led the Slavic attack on Thessaloniki that year. The Slavs asked the Avars for aid, resulting in an unsuccessful siege (617). In 626, Sassanids, Avars and Slavs joined forces and unsuccessfully besieged Constantinople. During the same year of the siege, the Sclaveni used their monoxyla in order to transport the 3,000 troops of the allied Sassanids across the Bosphorus which the latter had promised the khagan of the Avars. In 630, Sclaveni attempted to take Thessaloniki again. Traditional historiography, based on the De Administrando Imperio, holds that the migration of Croats and Serbs to the Balkans was part of a second Slavic wave, placed during Heraclius' reign.

Constans II conquered Sklavinia in 657–658, "capturing many and subduing", and settled captured Slavs in Asia Minor; in 664–65, 5,000 of these joined Abdulreman ibn Khalid. Perbundos, the chieftain of the Rhynchinoi, a powerful tribe near Thessaloniki, planned a siege on Thessaloniki but was imprisoned and eventually executed after escaping prison; the Rhynchinoi, Strymonitai and Sagoudatai made common cause, rose up and laid siege to Thessaloniki for two years (676–678).

Justinian II (r. 685–695) settled as many as 30,000 Slavs from Thrace in Asia Minor, in an attempt to boost military strength. Most of them however, with their leader Neboulos, deserted to the Arabs at the Battle of Sebastopolis in 692.

8th century
Military campaigns in northern Greece in 758 under Constantine V (r. 741–775) prompted a relocation of Slavs under Bulgar aggression; again in 783. The Bulgars had by 773 cut off the communication route, the Vardar valley, between Serbia and the Byzantines. The Bulgars were defeated in 774, after Emperor Constantine V (r. 741–775) learnt of their planned raid. In 783, a large Slavic uprising took place in the Byzantine Empire, stretching from Macedonia to the Peloponnese, which was subsequently quelled by Byzantine patrikios Staurakios (fl. 781–800). Dalmatia, inhabited by Slavs in the interior, at this time, had firm relations with Byzantium. In 799, Akameros, a Slavic archon, participated in the conspiracy against Empress Irene of Athens.

Relationship with Byzantium
Byzantine literary accounts (such as John of Ephesus) mention Slavs raiding areas of Greece in the 580s. According to later sources such as The Miracles of Saint Demetrius, the Drougoubitai, Sagoudatai, Belegezitai, Baiounetai, and Berzetai laid siege to Thessaloniki in 614–616. However, that particular event was actually of local significance. A combined effort of the Avars and Slavs two years later also failed to take the city. In 626, a combined Avar, Bulgar and Slav army besieged Constantinople. The siege was broken, which had repercussions upon the power and the prestige of the Avar khanate. Slavic pressure on Thessaloniki ebbed after 617/618, until the Siege of Thessalonica (676–678) by a coalition of Rynchinoi, Sagoudatai, Drougoubitai and Stroumanoi attacked. This time, the Belegezites, also known as the Velegeziti, did not participate and in fact supplied the besieged citizens of Thessaloniki with grain. It seems that the Slavs settled on places of earlier settlements and probably merged later with the local populations of Greek descent to form mixed Byzantine-Slavic communities. The process was stimulated by the conversion of the Slavic tribes to orthodox Christianity on the Balkans during the same period.

A number of medieval sources attest to the presence of Slavs in Greece. En route to the Holy Land in 732, Willibald "reached the city of Monemvasia, in the land of Slavinia". This particular passage from the Vita Willibaldi is interpreted as an indication of a Slavic presence in the hinterland of the Peloponnese. In reference to the plague of 744–747, Constantine VII wrote in the 10th century that "the entire country [of the Peloponnese] was Slavonized". Another source for the period, the Chronicle of Monemvasia, speaks of Slavs overrunning the western Peloponnese but of the eastern Peloponnese, together with Athens, remaining in Byzantine hands throughout the period. However, such sources are far from ideal, and their reliability is debated. For example, the Byzantinist Peter Charanis believes the Chronicle of Monemvasia to be a reliable account, but other scholars point out that it greatly overstates the impact of the Slavic and Avar raids of Greece during this time.

Max Vasmer, a prominent linguist and Indo-Europeanist, complements late medieval historical accounts by listing 429 Slavic toponyms from the Peloponnese alone. The extent that the presence of the toponyms reflects compact Slavic settlement is a matter of some debate and might represent an accumulative strata of toponyms, rather than being attributed to the earliest settlement phase.

Relations between the Slavs and the Greeks were probably peaceful apart from the (supposed) initial settlement and intermittent uprisings. Being agriculturalists, the Slavs probably traded with the Greeks inside towns. Furthermore, the Slavs surely did not occupy the whole interior or eliminate the Greek population since some Greek villages continued to exist in the interior, probably governed themselves and possibly paid tribute to the Slavs. Some villages were probably mixed, and quite possibly, some degree of Hellenization of the Slavs by the Greeks of the Peloponnese had already begun during this period, before re-Hellenization was completed by the Byzantine emperors.

When the Byzantines were not fighting in their eastern territories, they slowly regained imperial control. That was achieved through its theme system, which refers to an administrative province on which an army corps was centred under the control of a strategos ("general"). The theme system first appeared in the early 7th century, during the reign of the Emperor Heraclius. As the Byzantine Empire recovered, the system was imposed on all areas that came under Byzantine control. The first Balkan theme was created in Thrace in 680 AD. By 695, a second theme, that of "Hellas" (or "Helladikoi"), was established, probably in eastern central Greece. Subduing the Slavs in the themes was simply a matter of accommodating the needs of the Slavic elites and providing them with incentives for their inclusion into the imperial administration.

It was not until 100 years later that a third theme would be established. In 782–784, the eunuch general Staurakios campaigned from Thessaloniki, south to Thessaly and into the Peloponnese. He captured many Slavs and transferred them elsewhere, mostly Anatolia (these Slavs were dubbed Slavesians). However, it is not known whether any territory was restored to imperial authority as result of the campaign although it is likely that some was. Sometime between 790 and 802, the theme of Macedonia was created, centred on Adrianople (east of the modern geographic entity). A serious and successful recovery began under Nicephorus I (802–811). In 805, the theme of the Peloponnese was created. According to the Chronicle of Monemvasia the Byzantine governor of Corinth went in 805 to war with the Slavs, obliterated them and allowed the original inhabitants to claim their own. The city of Patras was recovered and the region resettled with Greeks. In the 9th century, new themes continued to arise although many were small and were carved out of original larger themes. New themes in the 9th century included those of Thessalonica, Dyrrhachium, Strymon and Nicopolis. From those themes, Byzantine laws and culture flowed into the interior. By the late 9th century, most of Greece was culturally and administratively Greek again except for a few small Slavic tribes in the mountains such as the Melingoi and Ezeritai. Although they would remain relatively autonomous until Ottoman times, such tribes were the exception, rather than the rule.

Apart from military expeditions against Slavs, the re-Hellenization process begun under Nicephorus I involved (often forcible) transfer of peoples. Many Slavs were moved to other parts of the empire, such as Anatolia, and made to serve in the military. In return, many Greeks from Sicily and Asia Minor were brought to the interior of Greece to increase the number of defenders at the Emperor's disposal and to dilute the concentration of Slavs. Even non-Greeks were transferred to the Balkans, such as Armenians. As more of the peripheral territories of the Byzantine Empire were lost in the following centuries, such as Sicily, southern Italy and Asia Minor, their Greek-speakers made their own way back to Greece. The re-Hellenization of Greece by population transfers and cultural activities of the Church was successful, which suggests that Slavs found themselves in the midst of many Greeks. It is doubtful that such large number could have been transplanted into Greece in the 9th century; surely many Greeks had remained in Greece and continued to speak Greek throughout the period of Slavic occupation. The success of re-Hellenization also suggests the number of Slavs in Greece was far smaller than those found in the former Yugoslavia and Bulgaria. For example, Bulgaria could not be re-Hellenized when Byzantine administration was established over the Bulgarians in 1018 to last for well over a century, until 1186.

Eventually, the Byzantines recovered the imperial border north all the way to today's region of Macedonia, which would serve as the northern border of the Byzantine Empire until 1018, although independent Slavic villages remained. As the Slavs supposedly occupied the entire Balkan interior, Constantinople was effectively cut off from the Dalmatian city-states under its (nominal) control. Thus, Dalmatia came to have closer ties with the Italian Peninsula because of ability to maintain contact by sea, but it too was troubled by Slavic pirates)l. Additionally, Constantinople was cut off from Rome, which contributed to the growing cultural and political separation between the two centres of European Christendom.

See also
Antes people
List of medieval Slavic tribes

References

Sources

Further reading
 
 Kardaras, Georgios. "Sclaveni and Antes. Some Notes on the Peculiarities Between Them". In: Slavia Orientalis Vol. LXVII, n. 3 (2018): 377-393.

External links
 
  

 
Greek words and phrases
South Slavic history
Medieval history of the Balkans
Barbarian kingdoms
South Slavic tribes